Temora, is a historic home located at Ellicott City, Howard County, Maryland. It is a T-shaped, two-story and cupola, Tuscan-style Victorian house of stuccoed tongue-and-groove boards. The house was built in 1857 after a design prepared by Nathan G. Starkweather, a little-known but accomplished architect from Oxford, England, who also designed the First Presbyterian Church and Manse at West Madison Street and Park Avenue in the Mount Vernon-Belvedere neighborhood in Baltimore, Maryland, with his later more famous assistant - Edmund G. Lind. The house was built for Dr. Arthur Pue Jr. on land given from his grandmother Mary Dorsey Pue of Belmont Estate. The name of the estate Temora comes from the poems of Ossian

Laura Hanna and Mrs John Breckinridge lived in the property afterward. County Councilman and representative William S. Hanna was also raised at Temora

A portion of the estate served as a farm with a hay field. In 1980, developer Alan Borg purchased the property, performing a minor restoration. In 1984 Borg held a "Decorator's Showhouse" event with rooms redecorated for free by various decorators retaining some of the original period materials combined with outside furnishings and materials. In 1985, Borg attempted to convert the house into a 15-room inn and restaurant, but failed to approval for the increased activity on the lot in a residential neighborhood. The land has been subdivided with a LDS Church built in the former pasture.

It was listed on the National Register of Historic Places in 1976.

See also
List of Howard County properties in the Maryland Historical Trust
MacAlpine

References

External links
, including undated photo, at Maryland Historical Trust

Houses completed in 1857
Houses on the National Register of Historic Places in Maryland
Howard County, Maryland landmarks
Houses in Howard County, Maryland
Buildings and structures in Ellicott City, Maryland
National Register of Historic Places in Howard County, Maryland
1857 establishments in Maryland